The Arlington Apartments is a building in Waukesha, Wisconsin, USA, built in 1928. The property was added to the National Register of Historic Places in 1987.

Tudor Revival was used for numerous houses in Waukesha, but this is the only Tudor Revival-style apartment building.

It was built as an 18-unit apartment building costing $60,000 that was to provide elegant apartments with modern/luxurious amenities including central heating and incinerator, and shower baths and Frigidaire refrigerators in each apartment. It was designed by George Zagel and Brother architects of Milwaukee, hired by the developer James Mahler, a real estate agent in Milwaukee.

References

Buildings and structures in Waukesha, Wisconsin
Apartment buildings in Wisconsin
Residential buildings on the National Register of Historic Places in Wisconsin
Tudor Revival architecture in Wisconsin
Residential buildings completed in 1928
National Register of Historic Places in Waukesha County, Wisconsin